Claude Guillermet de Bérigard (15 August 1578, Moulins – 23 April 1663, Padua), also known by the Latin form of his name Claudius Berigardus, was a French philosopher, physician and mathematician who became professor of philosophy at Pisa and Padua. He was a vocal opponent of the theories of Galileo. His last name is sometimes spelled Beauregard.

Works 

 Dubitationes in dialogum Galilaei Galilaei (Florence, Pietro Nesti, 1632)
 Circulus Pisanus. De veteri et peripatetica philosophia in Aristotelis libros octo Physicorum. Quatuor de coelo. Duos de ortu et interitu. Quatuor de meteoris, et tres de anima (Padua, Paolo Frambotto, 1660–1661)

References

Citations

Bibliography 

 Bedeschi, Giuseppe, ed. (2009). "Bérigard, Claude Guillermet, signore di". In Dizionario di filosofia. (Treccani.it)
 Bouillet, Marie-Nicolas (1863). "Bérigard (Cl. Guillermet de)". In Dictionnaire universel d'histoire et de géographie. Paris: L. Hachette. 
 French, Roger (1994). William Harvey's Natural Philosophy. New York: Cambridge University Press. 
 Ghisalberti, Alberto Maria, ed. (1970). "Beauregard, Claudio Guillermet signore di". In Dizionario Biografico degli Italiani. Vol. 7. (Treccani.it)
 Hallam, Henry (1884). Hallam's Works. Vol. 6.—Introduction to Europe in the Fifteenth, Sixteenth, and Seventeenth Centuries. New York: A. C. Armstrong & Son.
 Lasswitz, Kurd (1890). "Berigard". In Geschichte der Atomistik vom Mittelalter bis Newton. Vol. 1. Hamburg and Leipzig: Verlag von Leopold Voss.
 Michaud, Louis-Gabriel (1811). "Bérigard ou Beauregard (Claude Guillermet, seigneur de)". In Biographie universelle. Vol. 4. Paris: Michaud Brothers.
 Ragnisco, P. (1893–1894). "Da Giacomo Zabarella a Claudio Berigardo, ossia prima e dopo Galileo nell'Università di Padova". In Atti del R. Ist. veneto di scienze, lettere ed arti, 7(V), pp. 474–518.
 Rochat, Bernard (2008). "Bérigard (In Modern French, Beauregard) Claude Guillermet De". In Complete Dictionary of Scientific Biography. Vol. 2. Charles Scribner's Sons. pp. 12–14. Gale eBooks.
 Volpe, Galvano Della (1930). "Bérigard, Claude Guillermet, signore di". In Enciclopedia Italiana. (Treccani.it)
 "Bérigard, Claude Guillermet de-". (2021). Enciclopedia De Agostini. (Sapere.it)
 "Bérigard, Claude Guillermet signore di". (2021). Enciclopedia on line. (Treccani.it)

External links 

 Ockerbloom, John Mark, ed. (n.d.) "Berigard, Claude Guillermet, seigneur de, 1591-1663". The Online Books Page. Retrieved 31 March 2022.
 "Bérigard (In Modern French, Beauregard) Claude Guillermet De". Encyclopedia.com. (n.d.). Retrieved 21 April 2022.

1578 births
1663 deaths
17th-century French philosophers
17th-century French mathematicians